Ashley Phillip Adams (12 October 1955 – 17 March 2015) was an Australian Paralympic shooting medallist and cattle grazier.

Personal
Adams was born on 12 October 1955 in Toowoomba. He became a paraplegic in 1982 at the age of 26 after being involved in an accident at a local motorbike competition, where he fell off his motorbike and broke his back. Following his accident, he underwent a six-month period of rehabilitation. He was a cattle grazier who owned a  station near Blackall, Queensland. He made extensive modifications to the station's infrastructure to improve his access to the land, including the installation of gates that open both ways. He produced TendaBeef, and supported the genetic breeding of cattle.

Adams died on 17 March 2015 after a quad bike accident on his farm. He was 59.

Competitive shooting
Adams was a competitive sport shooter.  He started shooting competitively in 1993, after some previous experience with shooting working on farms. Events he competed in included R3 Mixed Air Rifle Prone, R1 Men's 10m Air Rifle Standing, R6 Mixed 50m Free Rifle Prone and R7 Free Rifle 3x40 50m.  When he competed in club-based events, he represented the Charleville Small Bore Rifle Club. He shot from a prone position on the ground similar to that of Olympic competitors, instead of a prone position in his wheelchair. He had an Australian Institute of Sport scholarship from 1998 to 2000.

In 1998, Adams set a world record at the English Match and won a gold medal in the 50m Rifle Prone event at the IPC Shooting World Championships in Santander, Spain. He finished first at the Swiss Open in 2002 and 2003. In 2007, he won a gold medal and a bronze medal at the Korean Cup. That same year, he finished first at the Australian Open Able-body Prone National Championship. In 2011, he competed in ISSF World Cup events in Turkey and Spain, where he finished first in the Spanish .22 event and second in the Turkish air rifle event. In Spain, he also picked up fourth place in the men's R7 50m rifle 3 position SH1 event and seventh in the R1 10m air rifle SH1 event.

In 2011, he was ranked first in the world in two different shooting events. In that year, he was also ranked as one of the top able-bodied open shooters in Australia. He was ranked in the top ten in the world for three events at the end of 2014.

Paralympics
Adams first represented Australia at an international level in the 1996 Atlanta Paralympics. He went on to compete at the 2000 Sydney, 2004 Athens, 2008 Beijing and 2012 London Paralympics. at the 2004 Athens Games, he won a silver medal in the Mixed Free Rifle Prone SH1 event and a bronze medal in the Men's Air Rifle Standing SH1 event. At the 2008 Beijing Games, he finished fourth in both the 10 m air rifle standing event the 50 m free rifle prone events. He finished in the top twenty in all four of his events at the 2012 London Games.

Recognition
Adams was recognised several times for his sporting accomplishments. He won a Merit Award given out by the Australian Paralympic Committee. He twice won the Male Athlete Senior Sporting Wheelies Award and received an Australian Sports Medal in 2000.

Australia's national peak body for target shooting sports, Shooting Australia, awards the Ashley Adams Perpetual Trophy each year, which recognises the best and fairest athlete of a calendar year as voted upon by only "Aiming4Gold" squadded athletes.

References

External links
 

1955 births
2015 deaths
21st-century Australian people
Australian male sport shooters
Paralympic shooters of Australia
Paralympic silver medalists for Australia
Paralympic bronze medalists for Australia
Paralympic medalists in shooting
Shooters at the 1996 Summer Paralympics
Shooters at the 2000 Summer Paralympics
Shooters at the 2004 Summer Paralympics
Shooters at the 2008 Summer Paralympics
Shooters at the 2012 Summer Paralympics
Medalists at the 2004 Summer Paralympics
Wheelchair category Paralympic competitors
Recipients of the Australian Sports Medal
People with paraplegia
Sportsmen from Queensland
Sportspeople from Toowoomba
Road incident deaths in Queensland